Ramdurg is a taluka in Belagavi district, Karnataka state, India.  the 2011 Census of India, it had a population of 223,727 across 115 villages. There were 113,560 males and 110,167 females.

Villages 
As of 2011, the following villages were assigned to Ramdurg taluka.

 Aneguddi
 Aribenchi
 Awaradi
 Bannur
 Batakurki
 Beedaki
 Bennur
 Bhagojikoppa
 Bijaguppi
 Bochabal
 Boodanur
 Budnikhurd
 Channatti
 Chennapur
 Chetan Nagar
 Chikkamulangi
 Chikkoppa K.S.
 Chikkoppa S.K.
 Chiktadashi
 Chilamur
 Chinchakhandi
 Chippalkatti
 Chunchanur
 Dadibhavi Salapur
 Dodamangadi
 Durganagar
 Ghatakanur
 Godachi
 Gokulnagar
 Gonaganur
 Gonnagar
 Gudagoppa
 Gudagumnal
 Gudakatti
 Guttigoli
 Halagatti
 Haletoragal
 Halolli
 Hampiholi
 Hanama Sagar
 Hanamapur S.U.
 Hirekoppa K.S.
 Hiremulangi
 Hiretadashi
 Hosakeri
 Hosakoti
 Huligoppa
 Hulkund
 Idagal
 Jalikatti
 K.Chandargi
 K.Junipeth
 Kadampur
 Kadlikoppa
 Kalamad
 Kalhal
 Kallur
 Kamakeri
 Kamanakoppa
 Kankanwadi
 Karadigudda
 Katakol
 Kesaragoppa
 Khanapeth
 Kilabanur
 Kittur
 Kolachi
 Krishnanagar
 Kullur
 Kunnal
 Lakhanayakanakoppa
 Lingadal
 M.Chandargi
 M.Kallapur
 M.Khanapur
 M.Timmapur
 Maganur
 Mallapur
 Manihal
 Maradagi
 Mudakavi
 Mudenkoppa
 Mudenur
 Mullur
 Murakatnal
 Naganur
 Nandihal
 Narasapur
 Obalapur
 Padamandi
 Panchagaon
 Ramapur
 Rankalkoppa
 Revadikoppa
 Rokkadakatti
 Sangal
 Sarakote Devapur
 Shirasapur
 Shivanakote
 Shivapeth
 Sidnal
 Somapur
 Soppadla
 Sunnal
 Sureban
 Timmapur S.A.
 Tondikatti
 Toranagatti
 Totagatti
 Turanur
 Udapudi
 Ujjinakoppa
 Umatar
 Venkateshwarnagar
 Venktapur

Belagavi district
Taluks of Karnataka

References